"Wonderland" is a single by XTC released in June 1983, written by Colin Moulding and taken from the album Mummer.

Unlike most of XTC's work - which usually features a more guitar-oriented sound - "Wonderland" is heavily laden with synthesizer textures, most of which came from a Prophet-5 (the band's main synthesizer at the time).

This was the only single issued in the U.S. by Geffen Records from the album.

A promotional music video was directed by Peter Sinclair.

This is one of the songs from the Mummer sessions to feature drummer Terry Chambers prior to his departure from XTC.

Andy Partridge has subsequently described "Wonderland" as one of Moulding's "most beautiful melodies".

Track listing
"Wonderland" (Colin Moulding) – 3:50
"Jump" (Andy Partridge) – 4:39

Personnel
Terry Chambers – drums
Dave Gregory – guitar
Colin Moulding – vocals, bass
Steve Nye – mini-korg
Andy Partridge – guitar
Mixed by Alex Sadkin and Phil Thornalley at RAK Studio Two

References

External links

Songs written by Colin Moulding
1983 singles
XTC songs
Virgin Records singles
1983 songs